Marcus Edwards (born 3 December 1998) is an English professional footballer who plays as an attacking midfielder or as a winger for Primeira Liga club Sporting CP.

Formed at Tottenham Hotspur, where he made one substitute appearance in the EFL Cup, he transferred to Vitória de Guimarães in 2019 and was sold to Sporting in January 2022 for an initial €7.67 million. He has played over 100 Primeira Liga games and holds the record for most goals by an English player in that league.

Edwards earned 49 caps for England from under-16 to under-20 level, scoring 15 goals. He was part of the under-19 team that won the 2017 European Championship

Club career

Tottenham Hotspur
Edwards joined the academy system at Tottenham Hotspur at the age of eight and progressed through the ranks. On 2 August 2016, he signed his first professional contract with Tottenham after a protracted period of negotiations amidst interest from other clubs.

Edwards joined the Tottenham first team in the summer of 2016 for their pre-season tour and produced some impressive performances in pre-season matches. He was given a squad number of 48 ahead of the 2016–17 season. On 20 September 2016, Mauricio Pochettino likened Edwards to a young Lionel Messi due to his low centre of gravity and ability to beat a man. The next day Edwards made his competitive debut in the EFL Cup third round at home to Gillingham, coming on as a substitute for the final 15 minutes in place of Vincent Janssen and taking a shot that was saved by Stuart Nelson in a 5–0 win. However, he injured his ankle in October which required surgery, and was sidelined for a long period to recover from the injury.

On 29 July 2017, Edwards signed a new contract at Tottenham, keeping him at the club until 2020. In the UEFA Youth League, he scored twice in a 4–0 win over Borussia Dortmund on 13 September. He went on to make five appearances and scoring two more goals throughout the group stage.

Loan spells
In January 2018, Edwards moved on loan to Championship side Norwich City for the remainder of the 2017–18 season. He made his Norwich City debut on 30 March, coming on as a late substitute for Mario Vrančić, in a 2–0 home loss against Fulham. This turned out to be his only appearance for the club as he returned to Tottenham on 10 April for "personal reasons".

In August 2018, Edwards joined Dutch side Excelsior on a season-long loan. On 25 September, he was sent off in the first round of the KNVB Cup in a 3–2 extra-time home loss to NEC Nijmegen, for two bookings within six minutes late in the game. He scored two goals in 25 appearances for club with four assists, and although he scored a goal in the relegation play-offs, Excelsior was relegated. Edwards led the Eredivisie table at the end of the season in dribbles per game, with 3.3, ahead of PSV's Steven Bergwijn (3.2).

Vitória de Guimarães

On 2 September 2019, Portuguese Primeira Liga club Vitória S.C. signed Edwards on a four-year deal, purchasing 50% of his economic rights and setting a €15 million buyout clause. He scored his first goal on 24 October in the UEFA Europa League group stage, opening a 3–2 loss at his former club's rivals, Arsenal. With seven goals and five assists over the league season, he was one of ten candidates for its best player. He and João Carlos Teixeira both scored twice on 8 February 2020 in a 7–0 win at local rivals Famalicão, who were in contention for a Europa League place.

Edwards scored the only goal at Boavista on 19 October 2020, his eighth in Portugal's top flight. With that, he surpassed Brian Deane of Benfica in 1998 as the highest scoring Englishman in the history of the league.

On 7 January 2021, Edwards' contract was extended to 2024, with a release clause of €50 million. A year and three days later, he came on as a substitute away to Gil Vicente, won and scored a penalty with three minutes remaining, and was then sent off in a 3–2 loss.

Sporting CP
Edwards was transferred to reigning Primeira Liga champions Sporting CP on 31 January 2022 for a fee of €7.67 million with a further €500,000 if certain objectives are met. Sporting bought the 50% of his economic rights held by Vitória, while sending Bruno Gaspar and Geny Catamo in the opposite direction, on a permanent basis and a loan respectively. He made his debut two days later in a 4–1 win away to B-SAD, replacing Pablo Sarabia for the final 19 minutes; his first goal was on 19 March against his former employers Vitória de Guimarães, concluding a 3–1 away win with a long-range strike in the eighth minute of added time, having again replaced Sarabia with four minutes remaining.

On 7 September 2022, Edwards scored his first Champions League goal and provided an assist in a 3–0 away win against Eintracht Frankfurt, while on 26 October, he scored a goal in a 1–1 away draw against his former club, Tottenham Hotspur. In Sporting's run in the 2022–23 Taça da Liga he scored in a 6–0 rout of Farense in the first group game, and a 5–0 quarter-final win against Braga also at the Estádio José Alvalade; he started in the final on 28 January, a 2–0 loss to Porto in which he had a goal ruled out for offside.

In January 2023, Sporting received 15% more of Edwards's economic rights from Tottenham, as part of the deal that sent Pedro Porro to the Tottenham Hotspur Stadium.

International career
Edwards is eligible to play for England through his father and Cyprus through his mother.

In November 2013, Edwards made his England U16 debut, where he played 80 minutes, in a 1–0 loss against Northern Ireland. He went on to make six appearances and scoring once for the U16 side.

In the England under-17 side, Edwards scored three times throughout 2014, including a brace on his debut in a 5–1 win over Iceland. Edwards was selected to represent England at the 2015 UEFA European Under-17 Championship. During the tournament, he made five appearances, and scored two goals against Italy and the Republic of Ireland. He was subsequently included in the team of the tournament. Edwards also appeared at the 2015 FIFA U-17 World Cup.

In September 2015, Edwards was called up to the England U18 squad, making his debut in a 2–0 win over the Netherlands, in which he set up one of the goals. He also scored a brace on two occasions against Austria and the Republic of Ireland in March 2016. Edwards made five appearances and scored four times for England U18.

In October 2016, Edwards was called up to the England under-19 squad, making his debut in a 3–1 win over Croatia before scoring in a follow-up match with a 2–1 win over Bulgaria. He was included in the squad for the 2017 UEFA European Under-19 Championship. In the semi-final, he came off the bench to provide the assist for Lukas Nmecha to score the only goal of the game against the Czech Republic. He was also a second-half substitute during the victory against Portugal in the final.

After the end of the tournament, Edwards was called up to the England U20 squad in August 2017 and scored on his  debut, in a 3–0 win over the Netherlands.

Personal life
Edwards is of Greek Cypriot descent through his mother.

Career statistics

Honours
England U19
 UEFA European Under-19 Championship: 2017

Individual
UEFA European U-17 Championship Team of the Tournament: 2015

References

External links
England profile at The FA

1998 births
Living people
English people of Greek Cypriot descent
English footballers
Footballers from the London Borough of Camden
Association football midfielders
England youth international footballers
Tottenham Hotspur F.C. players
Norwich City F.C. players
Excelsior Rotterdam players
Vitória S.C. players
Sporting CP footballers
English Football League players
Eredivisie players
Primeira Liga players
English expatriate footballers
English expatriate sportspeople in the Netherlands
Expatriate footballers in the Netherlands
English expatriate sportspeople in Portugal
Expatriate footballers in Portugal